The Velveteen Rabbit is an album by pianist George Winston and actress Meryl Streep, released in 1985. The 1922 story by Margery Williams, The Velveteen Rabbit, is narrated by Streep accompanied by Winston's piano pieces, which also appear without narration. The album was produced by Mark Sottnick and Clay Stites.

Track listing
All songs by George Winston

Narration and music
 "The Velveteen Rabbit" (Piano Solo) – 1:00
 "Christmas" – 1:47
 "The Toys" – 1:35
 "The Skin Horse" – 2:52
 "Nana" – 0:30
 "Lullaby" – 2:54
 "Spring" – 2:27
 "Summer" – 1:19
 "The Rabbit Dance" – 3:04
 "Alone" (Piano Solo) – 1:01
 "Shabbiness Doesn't Matter" – 1:35
 "Anxious Moments" – 2:20
 "The Fairy" – 3:38
 "Flying" – 2:29
 "Returning" – 1:18
 "The Velveteen Rabbit" (Piano Solo) – 2:39

Piano solos without narration
 "The Velveteen Rabbit" - 1:00
 "Christmas" - 1:46
 "The Toys" - 1:35
 "The Skin Horse" - 0:51
 "This Magic Called Real" - 0:31
 "Lullaby (Sandman)" - 2:54
 "Spring (The Velveteen Rabbit)" - 2:27
 "Summer" - 1:19
 "Summer Evening" - 0:49
 "The Rabbit Dance" - 1:08
 "Alone" - 1:08
 "Shabbiness Doesn't Matter" - 1:09
 "Anxious Moments--Part 1" - 1:20
 "Loneliness" - 2:22
 "Anxious Moments--Part 2/The Fairy - 0:50
 "Flying" - 2:31
 "Returning/The Velveteen Rabbit" - 4:00
 BONUS TRACK: "Night Thoughts" - 4:33

Personnel
George Winston – piano
Meryl Streep – narration

Charts

References

External links
Liner Notes

George Winston albums
1984 soundtrack albums
Meryl Streep
Music based on works
Windham Hill Records soundtracks